Sergey Semenovich Kozlov (4 May 1960 – 4 January 2014) was a Russian football player and manager who primarily played as a midfielder and defender.

Kozlov played in the Russian Top League with FC Okean Nakhodka.

Sergey Kozlov died following a long illness on 4 January 2014, aged 53, in his hometown of Khabarovsk, Russia.

References

External links
Profile at Footballfacts.ru

1960 births
Sportspeople from Khabarovsk
2014 deaths
Association football midfielders
Association football defenders
Soviet footballers
FC Dynamo Stavropol players
FC SKA-Khabarovsk players
FC Okean Nakhodka players
Russian footballers
Russian Premier League players
Russian football managers
FC SKA-Khabarovsk managers
FC Smena Komsomolsk-na-Amure players